Fred Mace (August 22, 1878 – February 21, 1917) was a comedic actor during the silent era in the United States. He appeared in more than 150 films between 1909 and 1916.  Mace worked for Mack Sennett at Keystone Studios. Shortly after he left, Roscoe Arbuckle, who had appeared in a few pictures at Keystone with Mace, took over as Sennett's lead comedic actor.

Mace was born in Philadelphia, Pennsylvania and died at the Hotel Astor in New York City in 1917. All of his work is in the public domain.

Selected filmography

 The Lucky Toothache (1910)
 The Villain Foiled (1911)
 Her Awakening (1911)
 Why He Gave Up (1911)
 A Voice from the Deep (1912)
 The Speed Demon (1912)
 The Water Nymph (1912)
 The Flirting Husband (1912)
 Mabel's Lovers (1912)
 Mabel's Adventures (1912)
 A Dash Through the Clouds (1912)
 Help! Help! (1912)
 A Game of Pool (1913)
 Murphy's I.O.U. (1913)
 Cupid in a Dental Parlor (1913)
 The Bangville Police (1913)
 The Foreman of the Jury (1913)
 The Gangsters (1913)
 When Dreams Come True (1913)
 Mabel at the Wheel (1914)
 My Valet (1915)
 Fatty and the Broadway Stars (1915)

References

External links

1878 births
1917 deaths
Male actors from Philadelphia
American male film actors
American male silent film actors
Silent film comedians
20th-century American male actors
20th-century American comedians
American male comedy actors